PNK or pnk may refer to:

 Polynucleotide 5'-hydroxyl-kinase, an enzyme
 Pauna language (ISO 639-3 language code: pnk)
 Pinnacle Entertainment (Stock symbol: PNK)
 Supadio Airport (IATA airport code: PNK sahoo)
 Airpink (ICAO airline code: PNK sahoo)